Kearophus guyanensis is a species of beetle in the family Carabidae, the only species in the genus Kearophus.

References

Scaritinae